Time stretching may refer to:
 Audio time stretching and pitch scaling, in audio
 Time stretching, in video
 Time dilation, in physics (relativity theory)
 Time stretch analog-to-digital converter, in electronics